900 in the Philippines details events of note that happened in the Philippines in the year 900.

Events

April
 April 21 – Namwaran and his children, Lady Angkatan and Bukah, are granted pardon by the Lakan (ruler) of Tondo, as represented by Jayadewa, Lord Minister of Pila, which released them of all their debts as inscribed in the Laguna Copperplate Inscription.

See also
Years in the Philippines
Timeline of Philippine History

References

Philippines

Years in the Philippines